(also spelled  or sometimes ) is the Japanese word for tattoo, and is used in English to refer to a distinctive style of Japanese tattooing, though it is also used as a blanket term to describe a number of tattoo styles originating in Japan, including tattooing traditions from both the Ainu people and the Ryukyuan Kingdom.

This method also requires special ink known as  ink (also called ); tattooing practiced by both the Ainu people and the Ryukyuan people uses ink derived from the indigo plant.

During the Edo period,  ("tattoo punishment") was a criminal penalty. The location of the tattoo was determined by the crime; thieves were tattooed on the arm, murderers on the head. The shape of the tattoo was based on where the crime occurred. Tattoos came to be associated with criminals within Japanese society. Two characters in the 1972 film Hanzo the Razor, set in the Edo period, are depicted with ring tattoos on their left arms as punishment for theft and kidnapping.

At the beginning of the Meiji period, the Japanese government outlawed tattoos, which reinforced the stigma against people with tattoos and tattooing in modern-day Japan.

Etymology
Tattoos are also sometimes called  which have a slightly different significance.

History of Japanese tattoos
Tattooing for spiritual and decorative purposes in Japan is thought to extend back to at least the Jōmon or paleolithic period (approximately 10,000 BC) on the Japanese archipelago. Some scholars have suggested that the distinctive cord-marked patterns observed on the faces and bodies of figures dated to that period represent tattoos, but this claim is not unanimously accepted. There are similarities, however, between such markings and the tattoo traditions observed in other contemporaneous cultures. In the following Yayoi period, tattoo designs were observed and remarked upon by Chinese visitors in Kyushu. Such designs were thought to have spiritual significance as well as functioning as a status symbol.

However, evidence suggesting a lack of tattooing traditions also exists; according to the early 8th-century , no such traditions of tattooing existed on the ancient Japanese mainland, with people who were tattooed regarded as outsiders.

Starting in the Kofun period (300–600 AD), tattoos began to assume negative connotations. Instead of being used for ritual or status purposes, tattoo marks began to be placed on criminals as a punishment.

Ainu tattoos

The Ainu people, the indigenous people of northern Japan, are known for their traditions of tattooing, though few Ainu people and people of Ainu descent have these tattoos in the modern day. These tattoos were frequently used for decorative and social purposes, with both women and men being tattooed. Women were tattooed on the hands, forearms, and mouths in indigo to signify moving into adulthood, to protect against disease, and for aesthetic purposes.

Japanese tattoos in the Edo period

Until the Edo period (1603–1867), the role of tattoos in Japanese society fluctuated. Tattooed marks were still used as punishment, but minor fads for decorative tattoos, some featuring designs that would be completed only when lovers' hands were joined, also came and went. It was in the Edo period however, that Japanese decorative tattooing began to develop into the advanced art form it is known as today.

, a tale of rebel courage and manly bravery, was illustrated with lavish woodblock prints showing men in heroic scenes, their bodies decorated with dragons and other mythical beasts, flowers, ferocious tigers and religious images. The novel was an immediate success, creating a demand for the type of tattoos seen in the woodblock illustrations.

Woodblock artists also began to practice tattooing, using many of the same tools they used for woodblock printing. These included chisels, gouges, and, most importantly, a unique type of ink known as " ink" or " black", which turns blue-green under the skin.

There is some academic debate over who wore these elaborate tattoos. Some scholars say that it was the lower classes who wore—and flaunted—such tattoos. Others claim that wealthy merchants, barred by law from flaunting their wealth, wore expensive  under their clothes. It is known for certain that  became associated with firemen, who wore them as a form of spiritual protection.

Tattoos in modern Japan
Following the opening of Japan's borders to the rest of the world at the beginning of the Meiji period, the Japanese government, conscious to protect its image and make a good first impression in the face of its new international status, outlawed tattooing, with  soon taking on connotations of criminality. Nevertheless, many foreigners, fascinated with the unique skills of Japanese tattoo artists, travelled to Japan with the express intention of being tattooed there, and traditional tattooing continued underground.

Tattooing was legalized by the occupation forces in 1948, but has retained its image of criminality. For many years, traditional Japanese tattoos were associated with the yakuza, Japan's notorious mafia, and many businesses in Japan (such as public baths, fitness centers and hot springs) still ban customers with tattoos. In 2020, the Supreme Court of Japan ruled that tattoos could be performed by people other than licensed medical professionals, a requirement still present in South Korea, after the home studio of an Osaka-based tattoo artist, Taiki Masuda, was raided by the police and the artist was fined. As a result, the Japan Tattooist Organization formed and created a hygiene and safety online course for artists that provides a certificate of completion, similar to practices in other countries.

Although tattoos have gained popularity among the youth of Japan due to Western influence, tattoos continue to be stigmatised throughout most of Japan; unlike many other countries, even finding a tattoo shop in Japan can prove difficult, with tattoo shops primarily placed in areas that are very tourist- or US military-friendly. According to Kunihiro Shimada, the president of the Japan Tattoo Institute, there are an estimated 3,000 tattoo artists throughout the entirety of Japan. Around 1.4 million adults in Japan have tattoos. Attitudes around the acceptability of tattoos vary significantly by age, with 60% of Japanese people in their 20s and younger agreed that rules for tattoos should be relaxed, according to the results of a 2021 survey.

There are even current political repercussions for tattoos in Japan. In 2012, the then-mayor of Osaka, Tōru Hashimoto, started a campaign to rid tattoos from public sector employees, claiming that "tattoos on City workers undermined trust in the City" and threatening to fire any government employee with tattoos. That year, he authorized a survey of all public sector employees asking whether they had tattoos. Multiple city employees filed lawsuits against the City of Osaka after being reprimanded for having tattoos. This survey, along with other tattoo-related policies implemented by Hashimoto, was eventually found to have violated the city's privacy protection ordinance by the Osaka District Court.

Modern tattoos in Japan are done mostly in a similar manner to Western tattooing. Unlike traditional , where the design is mostly left up to the artist, customers bring in a design of their choice or can decide on what they would like at the shop. Many Japanese artists are well-versed in multiple styles besides traditional Japanese tattoos, giving customers the ability to select from a wide assortment of options.

Modern tattoos are also done via an electric tattoo machine, in which the ink can be inserted into the machine, or the needle tip can be dipped into ink for application. Japanese artists are widely recognised for the quality of their work, despite the relative expense of  tattoos, and are highly sought-after.

Despite the majority of modern tattooing being done by needle and machine,  is also practiced with traditional tools, though tattoo artists trained in this style can be difficult to find; unlike most Western-style tattoo artists in Japan, the majority of traditional  artists are not located in the Tokyo area. Also unlike Western tattooing is the high expense of the technique, as well as the higher proportion of time required to complete one piece and the higher level of pain involved. A typical traditional body suit, covering the arms, back, thighs and chest, with a space left down the centre of the torso, can take up to five years of weekly visits to complete, and cost in excess of US$30,000. The process is also more formal than Western tattooing, with the artist having a greater level of control over the finished design.

Process

Being tattooed

The process of being tattooed in the  style can be difficult and time-consuming. The first step of finding a traditional tattoo artist can be a daunting task, as many tattoo artists in Japan are somewhat secretive in their work, with introductions made by word-of-mouth only, though the advent of the Internet has made finding an  artists more accessible.

After an initial consultation during which the client will discuss with the tattooist the designs they are interested in, the work begins with the tattooing of the outline. This will usually be done in one sitting, often freehand (without the use of a stencil), which may require several hours to complete. When the outline is complete, the shading and colouring is done in weekly visits, whenever the client has money to spare. When the tattoo is finished, the artist will "sign" his name in a space reserved for that purpose, most often somewhere on the back.

Wearers of traditional tattoos frequently keep their art secret, as tattoos are still seen as a sign of criminality in Japan, particularly by older people and in the work place. Many yakuza and other criminals themselves now avoid tattoos for this very reason.

Becoming an  artist

The process of training to become a traditional tattoo artist is difficult and time-consuming; tattoo artists will train for many years under a master, sometimes living in the master's house, and may spend years cleaning the studio, observing and practicing in their own skin, making both the needles and other tools required, mixing inks, and painstakingly copying designs from the master's book before being allowed to tattoo clients.

Tattoo artists must master the unique styles of tattooing by hand required, and will usually be given a tattoo name by their master, most often incorporating the word  (to engrave) and a syllable derived from the master's own name, or some other significant word. In some cases, the apprentice will take the master's name, and will become The Second or Third (and so on).

Glossary of Japanese tattoo terms

Common motifs
Some common images in traditional Japanese tattoos include:
 Mythological beasts and monsters: dragons, foo dogs, 
 Animals: birds, koi, tigers, snakes
 Flowers: peonies, cherry blossoms, lotuses, chrysanthemums
 Other plants: bamboo, maple leaves
 Characters from traditional folklore and literature, such as the 
 Images of the "floating world" inspired by ukiyo-e prints: geisha, samurai
 Buddhas and Buddhist deities such as Fudō Myō-ō and Kannon
 Shinto  (deities) such as 
 Backgrounds: clouds, waves, wind bars
 Masks used in Noh theater

See also
 Criminal punishment in Edo-period Japan
 Criminal tattoos
 Tōyama no Kin-san

References

Further reading
 Andrews, Joshua. The Art of Tattooing. howtotattoo.net, 2008.
 Fellman, Sandi. The Japanese Tattoo. New York: Abbeville Press, 1986. .
 Richie, Donald, and Ian Buruma. The Japanese Tattoo. New York: Weatherhill, 1980. .

External links 
 Japanese Traditional Art with World-Class Appeal – Irezumi・TATTOO-"Oukoshisei" – Irezumi by Horiyoshi III
 Epic Ink: How Japanese Warrior Prints Popularized the Full-Body Tattoo Collectors Weekly
 Irezumi and the art of story telling
 Yakuza Tattoo's Explained
 Japanese Tattooing

Japanese aesthetics
Japanese tattooing
Yakuza
History of art in Japan
Japanese words and phrases